Tutong Camp, also sometimes referred to as in Malay, Tutong Kem, is one of the military bases of the Royal Brunei Land Forces (RBLF) and it is also home to the Second Battalion (2Bn). The RBLF have two garrisons of army and military police stationed in the Tutong District, namely the Tutong and Penanjong Camp as well as a shooting range in Binturan.

It can be noted that the camp was previously referred to as Royal Brunei Malay Regiment (RBMR) Camp, Tutong. In 2016, the population was 1,099.

History
The base was completed by late April 1976 and later on May 10, 1976, the 2Bn officially moved into Tutong Camp after being temporarily based at Bolkiah Camp. A total of 6 blocks of flats within the camp were scheduled to be completed on November 26, 1978. On September 2, 1965, the 22nd Special Air Service (SAS) undergone a month long training period at the camp. The Sultan Hassanal Bolkiah presented the Royal Brunei Armed Forces with scented water during a ceremony at the Tutong Camp Parade Ground on July 12, 1994.

The Tutong District Tug-of-war competition was held at the Tutong Camp Sports Complex for the competition's final match on July 10, 2005. A fire was put out on the 3rd floor of a barrack with no injuries reported on March 21, 2015. Floods caused by heavy rain on December 7, 2019, prompt the Tutong District Disaster Management Committee (DDMC) to identify both Tutong and Penanjong Camps to be used as a place of refuge. Delegation from the Ministry of Defence was participated in the Fardu Maghrib prayer at the camp's Surau Pengiran Ratna Indera on April 14, 2022.

Facilities 
There are several facilities built within the base:

 Tutong Camp Sports Complex
 Tutong Camp Drill Square
 Tutong Camp Parade Ground
 Tutong Camp Primary School
 Tutong Camp Religious School
 Surau Pengiran Ratna Indera

References

External links

1976 establishments in Brunei
Royal Brunei Land Forces
Tutong District